The Zodiac is a 2005 American criminal psychological thriller film based on the true events associated with the Zodiac: a serial killer who was active in and around northern California in the 1960s and 1970s. The Zodiac was directed by Alexander Bulkley and co-written with his brother, Kelly Bulkley, and stars Justin Chambers, Robin Tunney, Rory Culkin, Philip Baker Hall, Brad Henke, Marty Lindsey, Rex Linn, and William Mapother.

The film was released on March 17, 2006 into just 10 theaters on limited release (with an R-rating by the MPAA) and later released on DVD in North America on August 29, 2006. The DVD hit the UK market on September 18.

Plot
When two teenagers are gunned down on Lake Helena (in real-life, Herman) Road on December 20, 1968, the small town of Vallejo (Benicia) is thrown into a state of terror. Assigned to the case is Police Detective Matt Parish (Justin Chambers) of the Vallejo Police Department. With few leads, the case goes unsolved and the emotional attachment causes heartache for Parish's family; wife Laura (Robin Tunney) and 12-year-old son (Rory Culkin).

Six months later on July 4 – as Parish begins to lose hope – the Zodiac strikes again. This time he guns down a couple in a deserted parking lot. He's inches away as he pulls the trigger, but he never reveals his true identity. Just an hour after the shooting, the Vallejo Police Department receives an anonymous call, confessing to the murders that have just taken place. Days after the second murder, a letter is sent to Bay Area newspapers the San Francisco Chronicle and the San Francisco Examiner, threatening that 12 more people will die unless the three papers print the encoded letter they've just received. The killer reveals that if they can decipher the note, his true identity will be revealed.

It becomes an obsession for Parish to solve the case. He spends all his time with the coded sheet, sketches of the killer and psychological reports, putting strain on his family. The ever-increasing publicity pushes him to the edge. When Parish receives more anonymous calls and ciphered letters (some suggesting the threatening chance that his next victim could be one of Parish's family), he thinks he's got his suspect. Disobeying orders by Chief Frank Perkins (Philip Baker Hall) he goes in search of the killer. When he storms into the suspect's house, his allegations are shattered because the man has no relation to the murders.

The police later hear of more killings, but the case doesn't get close to being resolved. On April 24, 1978, ten years after the first reported murder, the Chronicle receives another letter:

The film ends with the statement that the killer has not been captured.

Cast
 Justin Chambers as Det. Matt Parish.
 Robin Tunney as Laura Parish Matt Parish's wife.
 Rory Culkin as Johnny Parish (son of Matt and Laura Parish).
 Shelby Alexis Irey as Bobbie, Johnny's girlfriend.
 Philip Baker Hall as Chief Frank Perkin, the Police Department's chief and is the head of the operations.
 Brian Bloom as Zodiac Killer (voice).  His voice is heard throughout the film in phone calls and letters.
 Brad Henke as Bill Gregory
 Rex Linn as Jim Martinez
 William Mapother as Dale Coverling, a news reporter.

Production

Development
The Bulkley brothers and producer Corey Campodonico all grew up in the San Francisco Bay Area, and wanted to use their history and knowledge of the location for their debut film.

In an interview with Rotten Tomatoes Alexander Bulkley said:

Their main source of information was newspapers and media articles from  the time. The decision was made to tell the story of the detective involved with the case and how it affected his family, rather than following the psychological path of the killer.  The impact of the killings on the victims' families was avoided, due to the killer's perceived lack of interest in who his victims were.

The filmmakers' main challenge was to maintain the balance between facts and a fictional narrative:

Once the screenplay was complete, the filmmakers gathered investors to finance the project and made it ShadowMachine Films' first ever film production.

Filming
The filming lasted 23 days. The Zodiac was filmed on location in Vallejo, California, where the majority of the murders were committed.

Soundtrack
The soundtrack contains some of the following pieces by Andy Williams, The Chambers Brothers, William S. Gilbert and Arthur Sullivan:

Critical reception

Rotten Tomatoes, which compiles mostly North American reviews, showed that just eight out of 31 reviews were positive, with the average critic's grade being 4.1/10. The website assessed the film as "rotten", with 26% of the reviews favourable.

References

External links
 
 
 The Zodiac at Yahoo! Movies

2005 films
American films based on actual events
2000s English-language films
American docudrama films
American psychological thriller films
Crime films based on actual events
2005 psychological thriller films
Films set in the 1970s
Films set in San Francisco
American serial killer films
Cultural depictions of the Zodiac Killer
Films scored by Michael Suby
2000s American films